Joel de Oliveira Monteiro (1 May 1904 – 6 April 1990), known as just Joel, was a former Brazilian football player. He played for Brazil national team at the 1930 FIFA World Cup finals.

Honours

Club
 Campeonato Carioca: 
America FC (RJ): 1928

References

1904 births
1990 deaths
Footballers from Rio de Janeiro (city)
Brazilian footballers
Brazil international footballers
1930 FIFA World Cup players

Association football goalkeepers